Porgy & Bess Revisited, subtitled Played by a Very Unusual Cast, is an album of jazz interpretations of songs from the George Gershwin opera Porgy and Bess performed by cornetist Rex Stewart and trumpeter Cootie Williams, with saxophonists Hilton Jefferson and Pinky Williams and trombonist Lawrence Brown, that was recorded in late 1958 and released on the Warner Bros. label.

Reception

Scott Yanow of AllMusic states, "The two lead characters are played instrumentally by swing all-stars. Cornetist Rex Stewart portrays Sportin' Life, trumpeter Cootie Williams (who emerges as the main star) is Porgy, altoist Hilton Jefferson is Bess and trombonist Lawrence Brown is both Serena and Clara. Somehow it all works. Jim Timmens' arrangements for the big band keeps the momentum going, making this a surprisingly successful effort".

Track listing
All compositions by George Gershwin
 "It Ain't Necessarily So" - 3:58 
 "Bess, You Is My Woman" - 4:33
 "I Got Plenty o' Nuttin'" - 2:23
 "My Man's Gone Now" - 3:09
 "There's a Boat Dat's Leavin 'Soon for New York" - 3:24
 "Summertime" - 4:05
 "A Red-Headed Woman" - 3:03
 "Oh Bess, Oh Where's My Bess" - 3:27
 "A Woman Is a Sometime Thing" - 3:49
 "Oh Lawd, I'm on My Way" - 3:58

Personnel
Rex Stewart – cornet, trumpet (soloist: tracks 1 & 5)
Cootie Williams – trumpet (soloist: tracks 2, 3, 7, 8 & 10)
Hilton Jefferson – alto saxophone (soloist: track 2)
Pinky Williams – baritone saxophone (soloist: track 9)
Lawrence Brown – trombone (soloist: tracks 4 & 6)
Al DeRisi, Bernie Glow, Ernie Royal, Joe Wilder - trumpet
Eddie Bert, Urbie Green. Sonny Russo – trombone
Abraham 'Boomie' Richman, Al Klink – tenor saxophone
Sid Cooper, Walt Levinsky – alto saxophone
Buddy Weed – piano
Barry Galbraith – guitar
Milt Hinton – double bass
Don Lamond – drums
Joe Venuto – percussion
Jim Timmens - conductor, arranger
Unidentified musicians – French horn, wind instruments, string section

References

Rex Stewart albums
Cootie Williams albums
1959 albums
Warner Records albums